The 1972 Iowa gubernatorial election was held on November 7, 1972. Incumbent Republican Robert D. Ray defeated Democratic nominee Paul Franzenburg with 58.43% of the vote.

This was the last gubernatorial election in Iowa in which either party won every county. It was also the last election for a two-year term, with Iowa (alongside Arkansas, Kansas, Rhode Island, South Dakota, Texas and, as of date, Vermont and New Hampshire) being one of the last states to maintain two-year, as opposed to four-year gubernatorial terms.

General election

Candidates
Major party candidates
Robert D. Ray, Republican
Paul Franzenburg, Democratic 

Other candidates
Robert Dilley, American Independent

Results

References

1972
Iowa
Gubernatorial